Christina M. Greer is an American political scientist who researches U.S. politics, black ethnic politics, urban politics, and public opinion. She is an associate professor of political science at Fordham University.

Greer was born to Gloria and Theodore Greer. Her sister is physician Florencia Greer Polite. She attended high school in the Chicago metropolitan area. Greer earned a B.A. from Tufts University. James M. Glaser introduced her to the field of political science and served as an undergraduate mentor. She completed a M.A. M.Phil. and Ph.D. in political science from Columbia Graduate School of Arts and Sciences. Her 2008 dissertation was titled, Black Ethnicity: Identity, Participation, and Policy. Robert Y. Shapiro was her doctoral advisor.

Selected works

References 

Year of birth missing (living people)
Place of birth missing (living people)
American women political scientists
21st-century African-American scientists
African-American political scientists
African-American women scientists
21st-century African-American women
21st-century American women scientists
Tufts University alumni
Columbia Graduate School of Arts and Sciences alumni
Fordham University faculty
Living people